Róbert Demjan (born 26 October 1982) is a Slovak professional footballer who plays as a forward for Považská Bystrica.

Career
In summer 2010, Demjan joined Polish club Podbeskidzie Bielsko-Biała on a one-and-a-half-year contract.

On 1 August 2011, he scored Podbeskidzie's historic first goal in the Ekstraklasa.

He became the top scorer of the 2012–13 Ekstraklasa season, with 14 goals, contributing to Podbeskidzie's survival in the top flight. He was also chosen as the best player of the season.

References

External links
 
 
 
 Profile at Ligy.sk

1982 births
Living people
People from Levoča
Sportspeople from the Prešov Region
Slovak footballers
Association football forwards
Ekstraklasa players
I liga players
II liga players
Czech First League players
Czech National Football League players
Slovak Super Liga players
Belgian Pro League players
MŠK Púchov players
AS Trenčín players
FK Viktoria Žižkov players
Podbeskidzie Bielsko-Biała players
S.K. Beveren players
Widzew Łódź players
FK Fotbal Třinec players
1. SC Znojmo players
MŠK Považská Bystrica (football) players
FK Iskra Borčice players
Slovak expatriate footballers
Slovak expatriate sportspeople in Belgium
Expatriate footballers in Belgium
Slovak expatriate sportspeople in Poland
Expatriate footballers in Poland
Slovak expatriate sportspeople in the Czech Republic
Expatriate footballers in the Czech Republic